Gut Shabbes Vietnam (Hebrew: גוט שאבעס וייטנאם) is a 2008 documentary on a Chabad Hasidic family living in Vietnam. The film was written and directed by Ido and Yael Zand, and aired on Israeli television.

The film follows Rabbi Menachem Hartman of Chabad of Vietnam as he assists Jews travelling to Southeast Asia with religious services.

See also 
 Chabad in film and television

References 

2008 documentary films
2008 films
Chabad in Asia
Documentary films about Jews and Judaism
Films about Orthodox and Hasidic Jews
Films about Chabad
Jews and Judaism in Vietnam